Ujiji is a historic town located in Kigoma-Ujiji District of Kigoma Region in Tanzania. The town is the oldest in western Tanzania. In 1900, the population was estimated at 10,000 and in 1967 about 41,000. The site is a registered National Historic Site.

History
Historically the town that is now Ujiji was the home of the Jiji people.
Ujiji is the place where Richard Burton and John Speke first reached the shore of Lake Tanganyika in 1858. It is the site of the famous meeting on 10 November 1871 when Henry Stanley found  Dr. David Livingstone, and reputedly uttered the famous words “Dr. Livingstone, I presume?” Livingstone, whom many thought dead as no news had been heard of him for several years and who had only arrived back in Ujiji the day before, wrote “When my spirits were at their lowest ebb, the good Samaritan was close at hand, for one morning [my servant] Susi came running at the top of his speed and gasped out, ‘An Englishman! I see him!’ and off he darted to meet him. The American flag at the head of the caravan told of the nationality of the stranger. Bales of goods, baths of tin, huge kettles, cooking pots, tents, etc., made me think, ‘This must be a luxurious traveller, and not one at his wits’ end like me.’”

A monument known as the "Dr. Livingstone Memorial" was erected in Ujiji to commemorate the meeting. There is also a modest museum. There is a former slave route near the market. In 1878, the London Missionary Society established their first missionary post on the shore of Lake Tanganyika at Ujiji. Some in Burundi claim the location of the famous meeting is a few miles south of the former capital Bujumbura. However, the Livingstone-Stanley Monument in Mugere actually marks a visit the two men made 15 days later on their joint exploration of northern Lake Tanganyika.

Gallery

References

External links
 Photos
 

Populated places in Kigoma Region
Lake Tanganyika